Cecil Denny may refer to:

Cecil Denny (golfer) (1908–1991), English golfer
Sir Cecil Denny, 6th Baronet (1850–1928), police officer, Indian agent and author in Edmonton, Canada